Barreiro may refer to:

People
 Bruno Barreiro (born 1965), American politician
 Gustavo Barreiro (1959–2019), American politician
 Manu Barreiro (born 1986), Spanish footballer

Places
 Barreiro, Portugal
 Barreiro Municipality, a municipality in Portugal
 Barreiro (city), a city in the above municipality in Portugal
 Barreiro, Cape Verde, a town in Cape Verde
 Barreiro River (disambiguation), several rivers in Brazil and Portugal

See also 
 Barreiros (disambiguation)